Hollis Alphonso Copeland (born December 20, 1955) is a retired American professional basketball player. Born in Trenton, New Jersey, he was a 6'6" (1.98 m) and 180 lb (82 kg) small forward who grew up in Ewing Township, New Jersey and played high school basketball at Ewing High School and college basketball at Rutgers University.

Copeland was selected with the 2nd pick of the third round in the 1978 NBA Draft by the Denver Nuggets, but was cut during camp. He signed on with the New York Knicks and appeared in two seasons with them (in 1979–80 and 1981–82), but his career was hampered in his second Knicks season, after he dislocated several bones in his foot during practice.

After his basketball career, he became a hospital-care investigator, a sales representative and a stockbroker.

References

External links
NBA stats @ basketballreference.com

1955 births
Living people
African-American basketball players
Albany Patroons players
American expatriate basketball people in Spain
American men's basketball players
Basketball players from Trenton, New Jersey
CB Zaragoza players
Denver Nuggets draft picks
Ewing High School (New Jersey) alumni
New York Knicks players
People from Ewing Township, New Jersey
Rutgers Scarlet Knights men's basketball players
Small forwards
21st-century African-American people
20th-century African-American sportspeople